Lai King Catholic Secondary School is a Catholic secondary school in Lai King, Hong Kong. It opened in 1979 and is one of the few schools on the Lai King Estate. The school has over sixty staff and the principal is Mr Lau Kwong Yip.

References

External links

Educational institutions established in 1979
Lai King
Catholic secondary schools in Hong Kong
Secondary schools in Hong Kong
1979 establishments in Hong Kong